= Quincy Canal =

Former canal in Massachusetts, US

Coordinates: 42.251541°N 70.991211°W

The Quincy Canal was a small canal in Quincy, Massachusetts, that was built in the 1820s to haul freight in the city.

== History ==
In response to the high cost of moving stone by carts, work on a canal to link the creek to the quarry started in spring 1824. Due to the cost involved the project stalled later that year.

In 1825 construction restarted on a modified route under the auspices of the Quincy Canal Corporation and was completed in autumn 1826. Ultimately the construction costs were never fully recovered from freight income and the corporation folded. By 1876 only a short section from the mouth of Town Brook to Washington Street remained.
